The Tartigou River is a watercourse over  long in the Matapedia Valley in Quebec, Canada. Its origin lies in the Bon-Dieu Lake in Saint-Moïse, while its mouth is on the Saint Lawrence in Baie-des-Sables.

Etymology
The name Tartigou comes from a transcription of the Mi'kmaq word tlagatigotj. Tartig means "river of the little colony" or "little river of the colony."

Geography
The Tartigou River takes its water from the Matapedia Valley in the Bas-Saint-Laurent administrative region of the Gaspé Peninsula. Then, the river changes again to a northeast course until it reaches the Saint Lawrence River in Baie-des-Sables, also located in Bas-Saint-Laurent.

References

Rivers of Bas-Saint-Laurent
Tributaries of the Saint Lawrence River